John Dickinson (November 13 [Julian calendar November 2]  1732 – February 14, 1808), a Founding Father of the United States, was an attorney and politician from Philadelphia, Pennsylvania, and Wilmington, Delaware. Dickinson was known as the "Penman of the Revolution" for his twelve Letters from a Farmer in Pennsylvania, published individually in 1767 and 1768, and he also wrote "The Liberty Song" in 1768.

As a member of the First Continental Congress, where he signed the Continental Association, Dickinson drafted most of the 1774 Petition to the King, and then, as a member of the Second Continental Congress, he wrote the 1775 Olive Branch Petition. Both of these attempts to negotiate with King George III of Great Britain failed. Dickinson also reworked Thomas Jefferson's language to write the final draft of the 1775 Declaration of the Causes and Necessity of Taking Up Arms.

While in Congress, Dickinson served on the committee that wrote the Model Treaty, a template for seeking alliances with foreign countries, but he opposed independence from Great Britain. He either abstained or was absent from the vote on the Declaration of Independence and refused to sign the document after its passage. Nevertheless, Dickinson wrote the first draft of the 1776–1777 Articles of Confederation and Perpetual Union and served as a militia officer during the Revolution. He later was elected president of the 1786 Annapolis Convention, which called for the Constitutional Convention of 1787, and as a delegate from Delaware, he signed the United States Constitution.

One of the wealthiest men in the British American colonies, Dickinson served as president of Delaware (1781–1783) and president of Pennsylvania (1782–1785). Upon Dickinson's death, president Jefferson referred to Dickinson as "(a)mong the first of the advocates for the rights of his country when assailed by Great Britain", calling him "one of the great worthies of the revolution."

Together with his wife Mary Norris Dickinson, he is the namesake of Dickinson College, as well as of Pennsylvania State University's Dickinson School of Law and University of Delaware's Dickinson Complex. John Dickinson High School was dedicated in his honor in 1959 as part of the public school system in northern Delaware.

Family history

Dickinson was born in Alabama, his family's tobacco plantation near the village of Trappe in Talbot County, Province of Maryland. He was the great-grandson of Walter Dickinson who emigrated from England to Virginia in 1654 and, having joined the Society of Friends, came with several co-religionists to Talbot County on the eastern shore of the Chesapeake Bay in 1659. Walter also bought  on St. Jones Neck in what became Kent County, Delaware.

Croisadore passed through Walter's son, William, to his grandson, Samuel, the father of John Dickinson. There he began another plantation and called it Poplar Hall. These plantations were large, profitable agricultural enterprises worked by slave labor, until 1777 when John Dickinson freed the enslaved of Poplar Hall.

Samuel Dickinson married Judith Troth (1689–1729) on April 11, 1710. They had nine children; William, Walter, Samuel, Elizabeth, Henry, Elizabeth "Betsy," Rebecca, and Rachel. The three eldest sons died of smallpox while in London seeking their education. Widowed, with two young children, Henry and Betsy, Samuel married Mary Cadwalader in 1731. She was the daughter of Martha Jones (granddaughter of Dr. Thomas Wynne) and the prominent Quaker John Cadwalader who was also the grandfather of General John Cadwalader of Philadelphia. Their sons, John, Thomas, and Philemon was born in the next few years.

For three generations the Dickinson family had been members of the Third Haven Friends Meeting in Talbot County, and the Cadwaladers were members of the Meeting in Philadelphia. But in 1739, John Dickinson's half-sister, Betsy, was married in an Anglican church to Charles Goldsborough in what was called a "disorderly marriage" by the Meeting. The couple would be the grandparents of Maryland Governor Charles Goldsborough.

Leaving Croisadore to elder son Henry Dickinson, Samuel moved to Poplar Hall, where he had already taken a leading role in the community as judge of the Court of Common Pleas of Kent County. The move also placed Mary nearer her Philadelphia relations. Poplar Hall was situated on an artificially straightened section of the St. Jones River. There was plenty of activity delivering the necessities and shipping the agricultural products produced. Much of this product was wheat that along with other wheat from the region, was milled into a "superfine" flour. Most people at this plantation were servants and slaves of the Dickinsons.

Early life and family

Dickinson was educated at home by his parents and by recent immigrants employed for that purpose.  Among them was the Presbyterian minister Francis Alison, who later established New London Academy in Chester County, Pennsylvania.  Most important was his tutor, William Killen, who became a lifelong friend and who later became Delaware's first chief justice and chancellor.  Dickinson was precocious and energetic and in spite of his love of Poplar Hall and his family was drawn to Philadelphia.

At 18, he began studying law under John Moland in Philadelphia. There he friends with fellow students George Read and Samuel Wharton, among others. By 1753, he went to London for three years of study at the Middle Temple. He spent those years studying the works of Edward Coke and Francis Bacon at the Inns of Court, following in the footsteps of his lifelong friend, Pennsylvania Attorney General Benjamin Chew, and in 1757 was admitted to the Pennsylvania bar beginning his career as barrister and solicitor.

In protest to the Townshend Acts, Dickinson published Letters from a Farmer in Pennsylvania. First published in the Pennsylvania Chronicle, Dickinson's letters were re-printed by numerous other newspapers and became one of the most influential American political documents prior to the American Revolution. Dickinson argued that Parliament had the right to regulate commerce but lacked the right to levy duties for revenue. Dickinson further warned that if the colonies acquiesced to the Townshend Acts, Parliament would lay further taxes on the colonies in the future. After publishing these letters, he was elected in 1768 to the American Philosophical Society as a member.

On July 19, 1770, Dickinson married Mary Norris, known as Polly, a prominent and well educated thirty-year-old woman in Philadelphia with a substantial holding of real estate and personal property (including a 1,500 volume library, one of the largest in the colonies at the time) who had been operating her family's estate, Fair Hill, for several years by herself or with her sister.  She was the daughter of wealthy Philadelphia Quaker and Speaker of the Pennsylvania General Assembly Isaac Norris and Sarah Logan, the daughter of James Logan. She was also cousin to the Quaker poet Hannah Griffitts.  Dickinson and Norris had five children, but only two survived to adulthood: Sarah Norris "Sally" Dickinson and Maria Mary Dickinson. Dickinson never formally joined the Quaker Meeting because, as he explained, he believed in the "lawfulness of defensive war".  He and Norris were married in a civil ceremony.

In Philadelphia, they lived at Fair Hill near Germantown, which they modernized through their combined wealth. Meanwhile, he built an elegant mansion on Chestnut Street but never lived there as it was confiscated and turned into a hospital during his 1776–77 absence in Delaware. It then became the residence of the French ambassador and still later the home of his brother, Philemon Dickinson. Fair Hill was burned by the British during the Battle of Germantown. While in Philadelphia as state president, he lived at the confiscated mansion of Joseph Galloway at Sixth and Market Streets, now established as the State Presidential Mansion.

Dickinson lived at Poplar Hall for extended periods only in 1776–77 and 1781–82. In August 1781, it was sacked by Loyalists and was badly burned in 1804. This home is now owned by the state of Delaware and is open to the public. After his service as president of Pennsylvania, he returned to live in Wilmington, Delaware, in 1785 and built a mansion at the northwest corner of 8th and Market Streets.

Continental Congress
Dickinson was one of the delegates from Pennsylvania to the First Continental Congress in 1774 and the Second Continental Congress in 1775 and 1776. In support of the cause, he continued to contribute declarations in the name of the Congress. Dickinson wrote the Olive Branch Petition as the Second Continental Congress' last attempt for peace with Britain (King George III did not even read the petition). But through it all, agreeing with George Read and many others in Philadelphia and the Lower Counties, Dickinson's object was reconciliation, not independence and revolution. Dickinson prepared the first draft of the Articles of Confederation in 1776, after others had ratified the Declaration of Independence over his objection that it would lead to violence, and to follow through on his view that the Colonies would need a governing document to survive war against them. At the time he chaired the committee, charged with drafting the Articles, Dickinson was serving in the Continental Congress as a delegate from Pennsylvania.

When the Continental Congress began the debate on the Declaration of Independence on July 1, 1776, Dickinson reiterated his opposition to declaring independence at that time. Dickinson believed that Congress should complete the Articles of Confederation and secure a foreign alliance before issuing a declaration.  Dickinson also objected to violence as a means for resolving the dispute.  He abstained or absented himself from the votes on July 2 that declared independence and absented himself again from voting on the wording of the formal declaration on July 4. Dickinson understood the implications of his refusal to vote stating, "My conduct this day, I expect will give the finishing blow to my once too great and, my integrity considered, now too diminished popularity." Dickinson refused to sign the declaration, and since a proposal had been brought forth and carried that stated "for our mutual security and protection" no man could remain in Congress without signing, Dickinson voluntarily left and joined the Pennsylvania militia. John Adams, a fierce advocate for independence and Dickinson's adversary on the floor of Congress, remarked, "Mr. Dickinson's alacrity and spirit certainly become his character and sets a fine example."

Dickinson is one of only two members of the First Continental Congress who actively took up arms during the war.

In the Pennsylvania militia, known as the Associators, Dickinson was given the rank of brigadier general and led 10,000 soldiers to Elizabeth, New Jersey, to protect that area against British attack from Staten Island. But because of his unpopular opinion on independence, two junior officers were promoted above him.

Return to Poplar Hall
Dickinson resigned his commission in December 1776 and went to stay at Poplar Hall in Kent County. While there he learned that his home on Chestnut Street in Philadelphia had been confiscated and converted into a hospital. He stayed at Poplar Hall for more than two years. The Delaware General Assembly tried to appoint him as their delegate to the Continental Congress in 1777, but he refused. In August 1777, he served as a private with the Kent County militia at Middletown, Delaware under General Caesar Rodney to help delay General William Howe's march to Philadelphia. In October 1777, Dickinson's friend Thomas McKean appointed him brigadier general of the Delaware Militia, but again Dickinson declined the appointment. Shortly afterwards he learned that the British had burned down his and his wife's Fair Hill property during the Battle of Germantown.

These years were not without accomplishment however. In 1777, Dickinson, Delaware's wealthiest farmer and largest slaveholder, decided to free his slaves. While Kent County was not a large slave-holding area, like farther south in Virginia, and even though Dickinson had only 37 slaves, this was an action of some considerable courage. Undoubtedly, the strongly abolitionist Quaker influences around them had their effect, and the action was all the easier because his farm had moved away from tobacco to less labor-intensive crops like wheat and barley. Dickinson was the only Founding Father to free his slaves in the period between 1776 and 1786. Benjamin Franklin had freed his slaves by 1770.

President of Delaware

On January 18, 1779, Dickinson was appointed to be a delegate for Delaware to the Continental Congress. During this term he signed the Articles of Confederation, having in 1776 authored their first draft while serving in the Continental Congress as a delegate from Pennsylvania. In August 1781, while still a delegate in Philadelphia, he learned that Poplar Hall had been severely damaged by a Loyalist raid. Dickinson returned to the property to investigate the damage and once again stayed for several months.

While there, in October 1781, Dickinson was elected to represent Kent County in the State Senate, and shortly afterwards the Delaware General Assembly elected him the president of Delaware. The General Assembly's vote was nearly unanimous, the only dissenting vote having been cast by Dickinson himself. Dickinson took office on November 13, 1781, and served until November 7, 1782. Beginning his term with a "Proclamation against Vice and Immorality," he sought ways to bring an end to the disorder of the days of the Revolution. It was a popular position and enhanced his reputation both in Delaware and Pennsylvania. Dickinson then successfully challenged the Delaware General Assembly to address lagging militia enlistments and to properly fund the state's assessment to the Confederation government. And recognizing the delicate negotiations then underway to end the American Revolution, Dickinson secured the Assembly's continued endorsement of the French alliance, with no agreement on a separate peace treaty with Great Britain.

However, as before, the lure of Pennsylvania politics was too great. On October 10, 1782, Dickinson was elected to the Supreme Executive Council of Pennsylvania. On November 7, 1782, a joint ballot by the Council and the Pennsylvania General Assembly elected him as president of the council and thereby president of Pennsylvania. But he did not actually resign as president of Delaware. Even though Pennsylvania and Delaware had shared the same governor until very recently, attitudes had changed, and many in Delaware were upset at seemingly being cast aside so readily, particularly after the Philadelphia newspapers began criticizing the state for allowing the practice of multiple and non resident office holding. Dickinson's constitutional successor, John Cook, was considered too weak in his support of the Revolution, and it was not until January 12, 1783, when Cook called for a new election to choose a replacement, that Dickinson formally resigned.

President of Pennsylvania
When the American Revolution began, Dickinson fairly represented the center of Pennsylvania politics. The old Proprietary and Popular parties divided equally in thirds over the issue of independence, as did Loyalists, moderate Whigs who later became Federalists, and Radicals or Constitutionalists. The old Pennsylvania General Assembly was dominated by the Loyalists and moderates and, like Dickinson, did little to support the burgeoning Revolution or independence, except protest. The Radicals took matters into their own hands, using irregular means to write the Pennsylvania Constitution of 1776, which by law excluded from the franchise anyone who would not swear loyalty to the document or the Christian Holy Trinity. In this way all Loyalists, moderate Whigs, and Quakers were kept out of government. This peremptory action seemed appropriate to many during the crises of 1777 and 1778 but less so in the later years of the Revolution, and the moderate Whigs gradually became the majority.

Dickinson's election to the Supreme Executive Council was the beginning of a counterrevolution against the Constitutionalists.  He was elected president of Pennsylvania on November 7, 1782, garnering 41 votes to James Potter's 32. As president he presided over the intentionally weak executive authority of the state and was its chief officer but always required the agreement of a majority to act. He was re-elected twice and served the constitutional maximum of three years; his election on November 6, 1783, was unanimous. On November 6, 1784, he defeated John Neville, who also lost the election for vice president the same day. Working with small majorities in the General Assembly in his first two years and with the Constitutionalists in the majority in his last year, all issues were contentious. At first he endured withering attacks from his opponents for his alleged failure to fully support the new government in large and small ways. He responded ably and survived the attacks. He managed to settle quickly the old boundary dispute with Virginia in southwestern Pennsylvania but was never able to satisfactorily disentangle disputed titles in the Wyoming Valley resulting from prior claims of Connecticut to those lands. An exhausted Dickinson left office October 18, 1785. On that day a special election was held in which Benjamin Franklin was unanimously elected to serve the ten days left in Dickinson's term.

Perhaps the most significant decision of his term was his patient, peaceful management of the Pennsylvania Mutiny of 1783.  This was a violent protest of Pennsylvania veterans who marched on the Continental Congress demanding their pay before being discharged from the Continental Army. Somewhat sympathizing with their case, Dickinson refused Congress's request to bring full military action against them, causing Congress to vote to remove themselves to Princeton, New Jersey. And when the new Congress agreed to return in 1790, it was to be for only 10 years, until a permanent capital was found elsewhere.

United States Constitution

After his service in Pennsylvania, Dickinson returned to Delaware and lived in Wilmington. He was quickly appointed to represent Delaware at the Annapolis Convention where he served as its president. In 1787, Delaware sent him as one of its delegates to the Constitutional Convention of 1787, along with Gunning Bedford Jr., Richard Bassett, George Read, and Jacob Broom. There, he supported the effort to create a strong central government but only after the Great Compromise assured that each state, regardless of size, would have an equal vote in the future United States Senate. As he had done with the Articles, he also carefully drafted it with the term "Person" rather than "Man" as was used in the Declaration of Independence. He prepared initial drafts of the First Amendment. Following the Convention he promoted the resulting Constitution in a series of nine essays, written under the pen name Fabius.

In 1791, Delaware convened a convention to revise its existing Constitution, which had been hastily drafted in 1776. Dickinson was elected president of this convention, and although he resigned the chair after most of the work was complete, he remained highly influential in the content of the final document. Major changes included the establishment of a separate Chancery Court and the expansion of the franchise to include all taxpayers. Dickinson remained neutral in an attempt to include a prohibition of slavery in the document, believing the General Assembly was the proper place to decide that issue. The new Constitution was approved June 12, 1792. Dickinson had freed his slaves conditionally in 1776 and fully by 1787.

Once more Dickinson was returned to the State Senate for the 1793 session but served for just one year before resigning because of his declining health. In his final years, he worked to further the abolition movement and donated a considerable amount of his wealth to the "relief of the unhappy". In 1801, Dickinson published two volumes of his collected works on politics.

Death and legacy

Dickinson died at Wilmington, Delaware, and was buried in the Friends Burial Ground.   Shortly before his death he unconditionally freed all of his slaves.  While he had been economically reliant on them, he also wanted slavery to end.  By freeing all of his slaves upon his death, he thought this would contribute to the United States having a future without slavery.  Like many of the founders he believed slavery would die "a natural death."

In an original letter discovered November 2009 from Thomas Jefferson to Joseph Bringhurst, caretaker of Dickinson in his later years, Jefferson responds to news of Dickinson's death:
"A more estimable man, or truer patriot, could not have left us. Among the first of the advocates for the rights of his country when assailed by Great Britain, he continued to the last the orthodox advocate of the true principles of our new government and his name will be consecrated in history as one of the great worthies of the revolution."

He shares with Thomas McKean the distinction of serving as chief executive of both Delaware and Pennsylvania after the Declaration of Independence. Dickinson College and Dickinson School of Law (now of the Pennsylvania State University), separate institutions each operating a campus located in Carlisle, Pennsylvania, on land inherited and managed by his wife Mary Norris, were named for them. Dickinson College was originally named "John and Mary's College" but was renamed to avoid an implication of royalty by confusion with "William and Mary." And along with his Letters from a Farmer in Pennsylvania, Dickinson also authored The Liberty Song.

Dickinson Street in Madison, Wisconsin is named in his honor, as is John Dickinson High School in Milltown, Delaware, and Dickinson Hall at the University of Delaware.

An original stage play "Except, Mr. Dickinson" was presented at the 15th Street Meeting House in an off-Broadway setting. The show was written by August Nigro.

Social and religious views 
John Dickinson was a self-taught scholar of history, and spent most of his time in historical research. As an intellectual, he thought that men should think for themselves, and his deepening studies led him to refuse to sign the Declaration of Independence. He did not think it wise to plunge into immediate war; rather he thought it best to use diplomacy to attain political ends and used the insights he gained from his historical studies to justify his caution. Given that Dickinson was raised in an aristocratic family, his cautious and thoughtful temperament as a Quaker gave rise to his conservatism and prudent behavior. As Dickinson became more politically savvy, his understanding of historical movements led him to become a revolutionary. Dickinson was very careful and refined in thought.  Dickinson wrote in 1767, "We cannot act with too much caution in our disputes. Anger produces anger; and differences, that might be accommodated by kind and respectful behavior, may, by imprudence, be enlarged to an incurable rage."  He did not behave rashly, insisting that prudence was the key to great politics. Dickinson used his study of history and furthered his education to become a lawyer, which exposed him to more historical schooling. His education and religion allowed him to make important political decisions based on reason and sound judgment. John Powell states, "...these forces of Puritanism had a vigorous expression. It is precisely because Dickinson epitomized the philosophic tenets of the Puritan Revolution that his theories were of enormous importance in the formation of the Constitution, and have considerable meaning for us today."  His studies of history and religious viewpoints had a profound impact on his political thought and actions.

Dickinson incorporated his learning and religious beliefs to counteract what he considered the mischief flowing from  the perversion of history and applied them to its proper use according to his understanding. His religiosity contributed heavily to his discernment of politics. Quakers disseminated their theologico-political thought aggressively and retained a significant measure of political influence. Dickinson's political thought, given his education and religion, was influential towards the founding of the United States. The political theory of Quakers was informed by their theology and ecclesiology, consequently Dickinson applied his religious beliefs and his belief in adhering to the letter of the law in his approach to the Constitution, referring to his historical knowledge as he did so. Quakers did use secular history as a guide for their political direction, and they considered scripture the most important historical source.

Jane Calvert has contended that Dickinson was arguably an early feminist, partly because of his Quaker culture. He believed that women were spiritually equal to men and that they deserved equal religious rights. Unlike many men in the era, he took political counsel from women, particularly from his wife and his mother. Dickinson was also good friends with Quaker feminist Susanna Wright and was a correspondent of Catharine Macaulay and Mercy Otis Warren. He encouraged both Warren and Macaulay to continue writing. He additionally bought books that detailed the lives of strong Quaker women. As a lawyer, Dickinson often defended poor women in court, including Rachel Francisco, a "free mollato" who had been charged with infanticide. In 1776, while drafting the Articles of Confederation, he proposed the first gender inclusive language in an American constitution. In the proposed religious liberty clause, he wrote "No person or persons in any Colony living peaceably under the Civil Government shall be molested or prejudiced in his or their {his or her} persons or Estate for his or her religious persuasion or Practise, nor be compelled to frequent or maintain or contribute to maintain any religious Worship, Place of Worship, or Ministry, contrary to his or her Mind."

Almanac
Delaware elections were held October 1 and members of the General Assembly took office on October 20 or the following weekday. The State Legislative Council was created in 1776 and its Legislative Councilmen had a three-year term. Beginning in 1792, it was renamed the State Senate. State Assemblymen had a one-year term. The whole General Assembly chose the state president for a three-year term.

Pennsylvania elections were held in October as well. Assemblymen had a one-year term. The Pennsylvania Supreme Executive Council was created in 1776, and counsellors were popularly elected for three-year terms. A joint ballot of the Pennsylvania General Assembly and the Council chose the president from among the twelve counsellors for a one-year term. Both assemblies chose the Continental Congressmen for a one-year term as well as the delegates to the U.S. Constitution Convention.

Notes

References

Bibliography
 
 
 
 
 
 
 
 
 Powell, John H. "John Dickinson and the Constitution." The Pennsylvania Magazine of History and Biography 60, no. 1 (1936).

External links

 Biographical Directory of the United States Congress
 Delaware's Governors
 Delmarva Heritage Series
 Revolution to Reconstruction
 Soldier-Statesmen of the Constitution
 University of Pennsylvania Archives
 ExplorePAHistory.com
 The R.R. Logan Collection of John Dickinson Papers are available for research use at the Historical Society of Pennsylvania.
 
 

More information
 Delaware Historical Society – website
 University of Delaware – Library website
 Historical Society of Pennsylvania – website
 John Dickinson Plantation – website
 Wilmington Quaker Meeting House (burial site)

1732 births
1808 deaths
American Quakers
Continental Congressmen from Delaware
Continental Congressmen from Pennsylvania
18th-century American politicians
Delaware Democratic-Republicans
Delaware lawyers
American people of English descent
Delaware state senators
Governors of Delaware
Governors of Pennsylvania
Members of the Middle Temple
Members of the Pennsylvania Provincial Assembly
Militia generals in the American Revolution
Pennsylvania lawyers
Pennsylvania militiamen in the American Revolution
People from Wilmington, Delaware
People of colonial Delaware
People of Delaware in the American Revolution
Signers of the Continental Association
Signers of the Articles of Confederation
Signers of the United States Constitution
American slave owners
Burials at Friends Burial Ground (Wilmington, Delaware)
Quaker slave owners
18th-century letter writers
American letter writers
Founding Fathers of the United States